Jeans is a surname. Those bearing it include:

 Allan Jeans (born 1933), Australian football coach
 Constance Jeans (1899–1984), English swimmer
 Desmond Jeans (1903-1974), English actor
 Isabel Jeans (1891–1985), English actress
 James Hopwood Jeans (1877–1946), English physicist
 Susi Jeans (1911–1993), Austrian musicologist and teacher
 Ursula Jeans (1906–1973), English actress

See also 
 Jeans (disambiguation)

Surnames from given names